Hemilienardia rubicunda is a species of sea snail, a marine gastropod mollusk in the family Raphitomidae.

Description
The length of the shell attains 5 mm.

Distribution
This marine species occurs off the Philippines and in the Red Sea and the Central and West Pacific.

References

 Gould, A. A. "Descriptions of new shells collected by the United States north Pacific exploring expedition." Proceedings of the Boston Society of Natural History. Vol. 7. 1860.
 Wiedrick S.G. (2017). Aberrant geomorphological affinities in four conoidean gastropod genera, Clathurella Carpenter, 1857 (Clathurellidae), Lienardia Jousseaume, 1884 (Clathurellidae), Etrema Hedley, 1918 (Clathurellidae) and Hemilienardia Boettger, 1895 (Raphitomidae), with the descriptionof fourteen new Hemilienardia species from the Indo-Pacific. The Festivus. special issue: 2-45.

External links
 
 MNHN, Paris: specimen
 Smith, Barry D. "Prosobranch gastropods of Guam." Micronesica 35.36 (2003): 244-270
 TRÖNDLÉ, J. E. A. N.; BOUTET, Michel. Inventory of marine molluscs of French Polynesia. Atoll Research Bulletin, 2009

rubicunda
Gastropods described in 1860